Ahmed Demir Dogan (born 29 March 1954), born Ahmed Ismailov Ahmedov, is a Bulgarian oligarch and politician of Turkish ethnicity. He was chairman of the Movement for Rights and Freedoms (DPS) from 1990 to 2013.

Life and career 
Dogan was born in Pchelarovo to Demire Dogan from Drandar and an unknown father from Pchelarovo, Dobrich Province. In 1981 he completed his studies in philosophy at Sofia University and in 1986 earned the then equivalent of a doctoral degree after completing a dissertation on the theme of "Philosophical analysis of the principle of symmetry". He is the founder of the Movement for Rights and Freedoms (DPS), a liberal party that claims to represent the interests of the Turkish minority in Bulgaria.

In September 2007, Dogan's name was listed on an official report of communist-era secret police collaborators. According to the report, Dogan was a paid agent of the Committee for State Security from August 1974 until March 1988.

In October 2010, the Supreme Administrative Court (SAC) in Sofia acquitted Dogan of corruption in a case brought by the Parliamentary Commission regarding consulting fees paid in 2008 and 2009 in respect of hydro-power projects.

2013 attack 
On 19 January 2013, as Dogan addressed a large audience from a podium, Oktay Enimehmedov ran onto the stage. Enimehmedov, a Bulgarian national of Turkish descent, pointed a gas pistol within  of Dogan's head, but did not discharge the firearm. It was reported that the gun contained blank cartridges, and that one of the cartridges contained pepper spray. Had the gun been fired, it would have caused non-lethal injuries. Dogan grappled with Enimehmedov, who was then tackled and wrestled to the ground by security guards and delegates. He was beaten and kicked for several minutes before being arrested.

In February 2014, Enimehmedov received a sentence of three-and-a-half years' imprisonment.

References

Bibliography 

1954 births
Living people
People from General Toshevo
Shooting survivors
Bulgarian people of Turkish descent
Movement for Rights and Freedoms politicians
Bulgarian Muslims
Failed assassination attempts